is a Japanese mathematician working in number theory. He is currently a professor at Toyo University.

References

External links
 Website of Shin-ya Koyama

20th-century Japanese mathematicians
21st-century Japanese mathematicians
1962 births
Living people